The discography of Swedish pop group A-Teens includes four studio albums, one extended play, two compilation albums and thirteen singles.

Albums

Studio albums

Compilation albums

Remix albums

Extended plays

Singles

Promotional singles

Other appearances

Videography

Music videos

Video albums

See also
 List of songs recorded by A-Teens

References

External links
 

Discography
A*Teens
Discographies of Swedish artists